The Bodybuilding at the 1987 Southeast Asian Games was held between 15 September to 16 September at Senayan Convention Hall.

Medal summary

Men

Medal table

References
 http://eresources.nlb.gov.sg/newspapers/Digitised/Article/beritaharian19870916-1.2.23.11.1

1987 Southeast Asian Games
1987 in bodybuilding